Granite Spur is a rock spur along the north front of the Jones Mountains of Antarctica,  west of Avalanche Ridge. It was mapped by the University of Minnesota – Jones Mountains Party, 1960–61, and so named by them because the basement granite is well exposed here.

References

External links

Ridges of Ellsworth Land